Eucithara antillarum is a small sea snail, a marine gastropod mollusk in the family Mangeliidae.

Description
The length of the shell attains 16 mm.

The shell is ribbed, without revolving striae. Its color is yellowish brown, broadly banded with chocolate and shoulder tinged with the same color.

Distribution
This marine species occurs in the West Indies (?).and off Vanuatu.

References

  Reeve, L.A. 1846. Monograph of the genus Mangelia. pls 1-8 in Reeve, L.A. (ed). Conchologia Iconica. London : L. Reeve & Co. Vol. 3.

External links
  Tucker, J.K. 2004 Catalog of recent and fossil turrids (Mollusca: Gastropoda). Zootaxa 682:1-1295.
 Kilburn R.N. 1992. Turridae (Mollusca: Gastropoda) of southern Africa and Mozambique. Part 6. Subfamily Mangeliinae, section 1. Annals of the Natal Museum, 33: 461–575
 MNHN, Paris: Eucithara antillarum

antillarum
Gastropods described in 1846